Rasmus Andreas Torset (25 May 1897 - 9 December 1965) was a Norwegian politician for the Liberal Party.

He served as a deputy representative to the Norwegian Parliament from Møre og Romsdal during the term  1958–1961.

References

1897 births
1965 deaths
Liberal Party (Norway) politicians
Deputy members of the Storting